This article lists the winners and nominees for the Black Reel Award for Outstanding Actress in a Television Movie or Limited Series. The category was retired during the 2008 ceremony, but later returned in 2012. In May 2017 the category was moved from the film awards as part of the Black Reel Awards for Television honors thus resulting in two separate winners in 2017.

Winners and nominees
Winners are listed first and highlighted in bold.

2000s

2010s

2020s

Superlatives

Programs with multiple awards

Performers with multiple awards

2 wins
 Angela Bassett (consecutive) 
 Regina King

Programs with multiple nominations

3 nominations
 Five

2 nominations
 Abducted: The Carlina White Story
 Justice
 Lift
 When They See Us

Performers with multiple nominations

 4 Nominations
 Aunjanue Ellis

 3 Nominations
 Angela Bassett
 Kerry Washington
 Lynn Whitfield
 Alfre Woodard

 2 Nominations
 Halle Berry
 Michaela Coel
 Whoopi Goldberg
 Regina King
 Sanaa Lathan
 Queen Latifah
 Jenifer Lewis
 Anika Noni Rose
 Keke Palmer

Total awards by network
 HBO - 8
 Lifetime - 3
 Netflix - 2
 ABC - 1
 CBS - 1
 FOX - 1
 FX -1 
 Hallmark - 1
 Showtime - 1

References

Black Reel Awards
Television awards for Best Actress